Dianne Hollands (born 11 May 1983) is a retired New Zealand tennis player.

Hollands won five doubles titles on the ITF circuit in her career. On 7 December 2009, she reached her best singles ranking of world number 623. On 25 November 2013, she peaked at number 474 in the WTA doubles rankings.

Playing for New Zealand at the Fed Cup, Hollands has a win–loss record of 9–4.

She retired from professional tennis 2014.

ITF Circuit finals

Singles (0–1)

Doubles (5–4)

References

External links
 
 
 

1983 births
Living people
New Zealand female tennis players
21st-century New Zealand women